Orchestra London Canada was a professional Canadian symphony orchestra based in London, Ontario. The orchestra was founded by conductor and violinist Bruce Sharpe in 1937 with the name the London Civic Symphony Orchestra. In 1957 the orchestra changed its name to the London Symphony Orchestra, and it adopted its current name in 1981.

After weeks of speculation, the orchestra ceased operations on December 11, 2014 due to massive budget shortfalls.   The musicians of the now bankrupt organization formally filed for bankruptcy on behalf of the orchestra on May 22, 2015.  Despite this, the contracted musicians of the ensemble have continued to put on self-produced concerts within the London community.

Until early, former musicians of the ensemble played under the identity, "#WePlayOn". On January 20, 2017, however, the musicians launched their new identity, "London Symphonia," at a concert at Metropolitan United Church in London, Ontario. The new identity includes a logo change and the launch of a new website, LondonSymphonia.ca. The group has 28 musicians and a concertmaster.

See also
 List of symphony orchestras
 Canadian classical music

References

External links
 
 "London Symphonia"

1937 establishments in Ontario
2014 disestablishments in Ontario
Canadian orchestras
Disbanded orchestras
Musical groups from London, Ontario
Musical groups established in 1937
Musical groups disestablished in 2014